Nipper Creek (38RD18) is a historic archaeological site located at Columbia, South Carolina. The site includes archaeological evidence that documents 11,000 years of human activity, from the first Paleo-Indian occupants of the region to historic times.

It was added to the National Register of Historic Places in 1986.

References

Archaeological sites on the National Register of Historic Places in South Carolina
Buildings and structures in Columbia, South Carolina
National Register of Historic Places in Columbia, South Carolina